Stenoma jucunda is a moth of the family Depressariidae. It is found in Peru.

The wingspan is 18–19 mm. The forewings are light greyish ochreous, the costal edge somewhat deeper or fuscous, around the apex becoming suffused and gradually obsolete. There is a cloudy deeper ochreous spot on the end of the cell. The hindwings are grey.

References

Moths described in 1915
Taxa named by Edward Meyrick
Stenoma